"Believe" is a song by English musician Goldie released as third single from his 1998 album Saturnz Return.

It reached number 36 on the UK Singles Chart on 18 April 1998. The song features vocals from Goldie's frequent collaborator Diane Charlemagne and is one of the most soul and jazz-influenced tracks on the album alongside "Crystal Clear" and "Dragonfly".

Track listing 
Side A
"Believe" (extended version) – 7:01
"Believe" (Photek mix) – 6:56
Side B
"Believe" (Grooverider mix) – 10:43

Personnel 
 Goldie – production, keyboards, programming, guitar, drums
 Diane Charlemagne – vocals
 Tim 'Da Bass' Philbert – bass
 Justina Curtis – keyboards
 John Eastcoat – brass arrangement
 Rob Playford – engineering
 Twig – mastering
 Howard Wakefield, Paul Hetherington – design

Charts

References

External links 

1998 singles
Trip hop songs
1998 songs
Goldie songs